The 2018 European Figure Skating Championships were held in January 2018 in Moscow, Russia. Medals were awarded in the disciplines of men's singles, ladies' singles, pairs, and ice dance.

Records 

The following new ISU best scores were set during this competition:

Eligibility 
Skaters were eligible for the event if they represented a European member nation of the International Skating Union and had reached the age of 15 before July 1, 2017, in their place of birth. The corresponding competition for non-European skaters is the 2018 Four Continents Championships. National associations selected their entries according to their own criteria but the ISU mandated that their selections achieve a minimum technical elements score (TES) at an international event prior to the European Championships.

Minimum TES 
The ISU stipulates that the minimum scores must be achieved at an ISU-recognized senior international competition in the ongoing or preceding season, no later than 21 days before the first official practice day.

Number of entries per discipline 
Based on the results of the 2017 European Championships, the ISU allows each country one to three entries per discipline.

Entries 
Member nations began announcing their selections in December 2017. The ISU published a complete list on 27 December 2017:

Changes to initial assignments

Results

Men

Ladies

Pairs

Ice dance

Medals summary

Medals by country 
Table of medals for overall placement:

Table of small medals for placement in the short segment:

Table of small medals for placement in the free segment:

Medalists 
Medals for overall placement

Small medals for placement in the short segment

Small medals for placement in the free segment

References

Citations

External links 
 
  at the International Skating Union

European Figure Skating Championships
2018 in figure skating
2018 in Russian sport
International figure skating competitions hosted by Russia
Sports competitions in Moscow
2018 in Moscow
European Figure Skating Championships